Esa Rinne (born 3 May 1943) is a Finnish athlete. He competed in the men's triple jump at the 1972 Summer Olympics.

References

1943 births
Living people
Athletes (track and field) at the 1972 Summer Olympics
Finnish male triple jumpers
Olympic athletes of Finland
Place of birth missing (living people)